Baselworld Watch and Jewellery Show is a global trade show of the international watch, jewellery and gem industry, organized each spring in the city of Basel, Switzerland, at the Messeplatz.

The last Baselworld was held March 21–26, 2019. In 2020 and 2021 the event was not held due to the COVID-19 pandemic, and the 2022 event has been cancelled as well. Baselworld is part of MCH Group, which organizes around 30 live marketing platforms in Switzerland and abroad, including Art Basel in Basel, Miami Beach and Hong Kong.

History
The show dates back to 1917 with the opening of the first Schweizer Mustermesse Basel (muba), of which a section was devoted to watches and jewellery. In 1925, muba invited several watch manufacturers to participate.

In 1931, the Schweizer Uhrenmesse (Swiss Watch Show) was first held in a dedicated pavilion. After 1972's Europe's meeting place exhibition, companies from France, Italy, Germany, and the United Kingdom were also invited. In 1983, the show changed its name to BASEL with two numerals denoting the exhibition year, for instance BASEL 83. In 1986, companies from outside Europe were included for the first time, reflecting the increased number of visitors from the old continent. In 1995, the show was renamed to BASEL 95 - The World Watch, Clock and Jewellery Show. In 1999, a new hall with 36.000 sq-m of exhibition space was added. The year 2000 saw an increase of 6% in trade visitors. In 2003 the show was again renamed to Baselworld, The Watch and Jewellery Show.  In 2004, with the introduction of a new hall complex, the exhibition area extended to 160.000 square meters, and attracted more than 89.000 visitors. In 2018, Baselworld saw a significant drop in exhibitors to 650, and the duration of the exhibition was shortened by two days, although attendance remained stable. However, the Swatch Group communicated that they would no longer attend the next Baselworld with any of their brands in that year as well.

In the following year (2019) Baselworld announced that they would coordinate their dates from 2020 until 2024 with SIHH, and the management presented a new concept for Baselworld. The show will evolve from a classic trade fair to an experience platform and will also address consumers. In April 2020 Rolex, Patek Philippe, Chopard, Chanel and Tudor announced that they would be pulling out of Baselworld and host their own fair in April 2021.

The new Baselworld 
The management of Baselworld used the involuntary break, due to the Covid-19 pandemic, to rethink the concept and enhance the experience for the entire community online and on-site.

The new concept focuses on providing primarily a B2B platform in the mid-luxury segment. The Baselworld 2.0 shall be a platform where mid- and high-end watch, jewellery and gem companies can present their products. Moreover, retailers shall get an easy and efficient access to the industry.

Besides the main physical event in spring (the next one will take place from the 31st of March until the 4th of April 2022) in Basel, the new Baselworld will be a digital platform „supplemented by live events, which will be available to the jewellery, watch and gem industry around the clock, 356 days a year, worldwide”. For instance, there will be a Baselworld pop up event from August 30 to September 3, 2021, in Geneva.

The digital platform will provide a networking hub, which interconnects all players, so everyone will meet on our platform. The brands, the manufacturers, the retailers, the fans and the media, explained Michel Loris Melikoff the managing director of Baselworld. As a result of the release in fall, Baselworld will be the first independent platform which combines digital and live events.

See also
Hong Kong Watch & Clock Fair
Watches & Wonders

References

External links
Baselworld official website
Baselworld Event Coverage on DreamChrono Watch Blog
Baselworld Event Coverage on WorldTempus
The Instagram account of Baselworld
The YouTube channel of Baselworld

1917 establishments in Switzerland
Economy of Switzerland
Trade fairs in Switzerland
Horological organizations
Tourist attractions in Basel